Conasprella cercadensis is an extinct species of sea snail, a marine gastropod mollusk in the family Conidae, the cone snails, cone shells or cones.

Description
The shell pattern consists of about 30–40 spiral lines, extending from base to shoulder; these coincide with the raised posterior edges of spiral ribs on the anterior half of the body whorl. The sutural ramp is unpigmented.

Distribution
This marine species was found as a fossil in a Neogene coral reef-associated deposit in the Dominican Republic.

References

  Puillandre N., Duda T.F., Meyer C., Olivera B.M. & Bouchet P. (2015). One, four or 100 genera? A new classification of the cone snails. Journal of Molluscan Studies. 81: 1-23

cercadensis
Fossil taxa described in 1917